6M or 6-M can refer to:

6m, or 6 metres
6-meter band
NJ 6M, now  New Jersey Route 159
Elliott 6m, an Olympic-class keelboat
6 Metre, a class of racing yachts
Period-after-opening symbol
Lim-6M, a model of PZL-Mielec Lim-6
PMD-6M, a model of  PMD series mines
VF-6M, see  VMFA-232 
VB-6M, see  VMF-132
6M-GE, a model of  Toyota M engine
Yorkfield 6M, a model of Yorkfield
Welch OW-6M, see  Welch OW-5M
MH-6M, model of  MD Helicopters MH-6 Little Bird
H-6M, a model of Xian H-6
E-6M series, see Luna 13
6M, the production code for the 1984 Doctor Who serial The Awakening

See also
M6 (disambiguation)